Walden C. “Wally” Rhines (born November 11, 1946) is an American engineer and businessman. Rhines is President and CEO of Cornami, Inc., a fabless semiconductor company focused on fully homomorphic encryption. Previously, he was President and CEO of Mentor Graphics, a Siemens Business for 23 years and Executive VP of the Semiconductor Group of Texas Instruments for 21 years. Rhines was named overall CEO of the Year by Portland Business Journal in 2012 and Oregon Technology Executive of the Year by the Technology Association of Oregon in 2003. He was named an IEEE Fellow in 2017.

Early life and education

Rhines was born in Pittsburgh, Pennsylvania. His father, Frederick N. Rhines, was the Alcoa professor of light metals at the Carnegie Institute of Technology from 1946-1959 and founder of the department of materials science and engineering at the University of Florida, from which he retired in 1978; today the department is housed in Frederick N. Rhines Hall. Rhines earned his bachelor of science in engineering (BSE) from the University of Michigan in 1968 and his master’s degree and Ph.D. in materials science and engineering from Stanford University in 1970 and 1972, respectively. He earned his M.B.A. from Southern Methodist University in 1975.

Career

While at Stanford, Rhines co-invented the magnesium-doped gallium nitride blue light-emitting diode, for which he, Herb Maruska and David Stevenson were awarded a U.S. patent in 1974. Isamu Akasaki built directly on this gallium-nitride research and eventually won the 2014 Nobel Prize in Physics, along with Hiroshi Amano and Shuji Nakamura.

Rhines worked at Texas Instruments (TI) from 1972 to 1993, serving as executive vice president of the semiconductor group and president of the data systems group. While at TI, Rhines supervised development of speech synthesis chips used in the Speak & Spell; developed the first publicly available computer program (for a calculator) to calculate the Black–Scholes value of a stock option; and supervised the creation of the TMS320 digital signal processor. In a 1985 profile of Rhines in the Austin American-Statesman, industry consultant Will Strauss told reporter Russell Mitchell: "He [Rhines] can claim the TMS-320 digital signal processor chip; that's the one to beat on the street right now." By 1990, TI's share of the worldwide market for general purpose DSPs was approximately 60%. A January 1991 article in Electronic Business Buyer reported that "[s]ources say that TI has the only profitable general purpose DSP operation in the world."

Rhines became CEO of Mentor Graphics in 1993, when the company's annual revenue was about $340 million. The company passed $1 billion in revenue for the first time in 2011. In 2013 Mentor Graphics announced it would begin paying a quarterly dividend, making it the only of big three electronic design automation (EDA) companies to do so; (Cadence Design Systems and Synopsys are the other two). Rhines has led the company into new business areas, including providing software for the auto industry; of the big three EDA companies, analyst Tom Diffely said "Mentor has the most going on in these adjacent markets...I think (the auto industry) is going to be a long-term huge market for them."

Siemens announced its $4.5 billion acquisition of Mentor Graphics on November 13, 2016; the deal closed four months later. Rhines remained as CEO of Mentor, a Siemens Business and later CEO Emeritus through 2020.

Rhines joined the many-core accelerator chip company Cornami as CEO in March 2020.

Affiliations

Rhines has been elected five times (1996, 2002, 2004, 2008, 2010) to serve two-year terms as chair of the Electronic Design Automation Consortium, the international trade association for the EDA industry. He is a board member of TriQuint Semiconductor (1995–2015) and QORVO (2015–present). Previously he served on the boards of SEMATECH (1989-1993), the Semiconductor Research Corporation (2002–2020), Cirrus Logic (1995–2009), the Global Semiconductor Alliance (2007–2010), Global Logic Inc. (2014–2017) and the Computer and Business Equipment Manufacturers Association, now known as the International Committee for Information Technology Standards (1984–1987). From 1996-2005 Rhines was a trustee at Lewis & Clark College, where he remains a life trustee today and he serves on the Executive Advisory Board of the Lyle College of Engineering at Southern Methodist University.

Awards and honors

2021: Morris Chang Exemplary Leadership Award, top award issued by the Global Semiconductor Alliance (GSA)
2020: Semiconductor Industry Hall of Fame, VLSI Research
2019: ChipEx Global Industry Leader (issued by ChipEx Selection Committee - Leading Annual Conference of Israeli Semiconductor Industry)
2019: Sarabhai Award (Lifetime Achievement Award), India Electronics and Semiconductor Association
2017: IEEE Fellow
2016: honorary doctor of technology degree from University of Florida
2015: Phil Kaufman Award for his contributions to the EDA and IC design industries.
2014: Distinguished Eagle Scout Award (he became an Eagle Scout in 1964).
2009: International Engineering Consortium distinguished fellow award
2003: University of Michigan Alumni Society Merit Award in 2003
2002: Semico Research Bellwether Award
1998: honorary doctor of technology degree from Nottingham Trent University 
1970: U.S. Army Legion of Valor of the United States Bronze Cross for Achievement

Noted publications

Books

 
 

Rhines also is listed as a source in books about the evolving semiconductor industry.

Philanthropy

In memory of his father, Rhines endowed a graduate fellowship in Engineering at the University of Michigan in 2016  and four professorships at the University of Florida, including one in 2021 in fully homomorphic encryption in the Herbert Wertheim College of Engineering. From 1996 to 2020 he served on the board of Classic Wines Auction in Portland, which supports a variety of children and family charities.

References

University of Michigan College of Engineering alumni
Stanford University School of Engineering alumni
Southern Methodist University alumni
American technology chief executives
1946 births
Living people
Businesspeople from Portland, Oregon
Businesspeople from Pittsburgh
Fellow Members of the IEEE